Morgan Taylor Worsfold-Gregg (born 20 September 2003) is an English professional footballer who plays as a midfielder for Cleethorpes Town on loan from Lincoln City.

Club career

Lincoln City
Worsfold-Gregg signed his first professional contract with Lincoln City on 17 March 2022. He made his Lincoln City debut against Doncaster Rovers in the EFL Cup on 9 August 2022. On 12 August, he joined AFC Rushden & Diamonds on loan. He was recalled from his loan on 4 January 2023. On 17 February 2023 he joined Cleethorpes Town on loan for the remainder of the season.

Career statistics

References 

Living people
Arsenal F.C. players
Lincoln City F.C. players
Gainsborough Trinity F.C. players
AFC Rushden & Diamonds players
Cleethorpes Town F.C. players
Association football forwards
2003 births
English footballers